Sport Verein Vötting-Weihenstephan e.V 1948 is a sports club based in Freising, Germany. The club was founded on March 17, 1948. It is best known for its mens football team which currently plays in the Kreisliga (Kreisklasse 3, Kreis Donau/Isar).

Players

First-team squad

Notable Players

 Hans Pflügler began his youth career at SV Vötting-Weihenstephan, playing there from 1967 to 1975. He would go on to play for Bayern Munich, winning ten major titles and appearing in nearly 400 official games. Additionally Pflügler represented West Germany at the Euro 1988 and 1990 World Cup, winning the tournament.

References 

Football clubs in Bavaria
1948 establishments in Germany
Association football clubs established in 1948